Choriocarcinoma is a malignant, trophoblastic cancer, usually of the placenta. It is characterized by early hematogenous spread to the lungs. It belongs to the malignant end of the spectrum in gestational trophoblastic disease (GTD). It is also classified as a germ cell tumor and may arise in the testis or ovary.

Signs and symptoms
 increased quantitative chorionic gonadotropin (the "pregnancy hormone") levels
 vaginal bleeding
 shortness of breath
 hemoptysis (coughing up blood)
 chest pain
 chest X-ray shows multiple infiltrates of various shapes in both lungs
 presents in males as a testicular cancer, sometimes with skin hyperpigmentation (from excess chorionic gonadotropin cross reacting with the alpha MSH receptor), gynecomastia, and weight loss (from excess chorionic gonadotropin cross reacting with the LH, FSH, and TSH receptor) in males
 can present with decreased thyroid-stimulating hormone (TSH) due to hyperthyroidism.

Cause 
Choriocarcinoma of the placenta during pregnancy is preceded by:
 hydatidiform mole (50% of cases)
 spontaneous abortion (20% of cases)
 ectopic pregnancy (2% of cases)
 normal term pregnancy (20–30% of cases)
 hyperemesis gravidarum

Rarely, choriocarcinoma occurs in primary locations other than the placenta;  very rarely, it occurs in testicles. Although trophoblastic components are common components of mixed germ cell tumors, pure choriocarcinoma of the adult testis is rare. Pure choriocarcinoma of the testis represents the most aggressive pathologic variant of germ cell tumors in adults, characteristically with early hematogenous and lymphatic metastatic spread. Because of early spread and inherent resistance to anticancer drugs, patients have poor prognosis. Elements of choriocarcinoma in a mixed testicular tumor have no prognostic importance.

Choriocarcinomas can also occur in the ovaries and other organs.

Pathology
Characteristic feature is the identification of intimately related syncytiotrophoblasts and cytotrophoblasts without formation of definite placental type villi. Since choriocarcinomas include syncytiotrophoblasts (beta-HCG producing cells), they cause elevated blood levels of beta-human chorionic gonadotropin.

Syncytiotrophoblasts are large multi-nucleated cells with eosinophilic cytoplasm.  They often surround the cytotrophoblasts, reminiscent of their normal anatomical relationship in chorionic villi.  Cytotrophoblasts are polyhedral, mononuclear cells with hyperchromatic nuclei and a clear or pale cytoplasm.  Extensive hemorrhage is a common finding.

Treatment
Since gestational choriocarcinoma (which arises from a hydatidiform mole) contains paternal DNA (and thus paternal antigens), it is exquisitely sensitive to chemotherapy. The cure rates, even for metastatic gestational choriocarcinoma, more than 90% when using chemotherapy for invasive mole and choriocarcinoma.

As of 2019, treatment with either single-agent methotrexate or actinomycin-D is recommended for low-risk disease, while intense combination regimens including EMACO (etoposide, methotrexate, actinomycin D, cyclophosphamide and vincristine (Oncovin) are recommended for intermediate or high-risk disease.

Hysterectomy (surgical removal of the uterus) can also be offered to patients >40 years of age or those for whom sterilisation is not an obstacle. It may be required for those with severe infection and uncontrolled bleeding.

Choriocarcinoma arising in the testicle is rare, malignant and highly resistant to chemotherapy. The same is true of choriocarcinoma arising in the ovary. Testicular choriocarcinoma has the worst prognosis of all germ-cell cancers.

References

External links 

 

Gynaecological cancer
Male genital neoplasia
Germ cell neoplasia